The 1960–61 Toronto Maple Leafs season was the 44th season of operation of the Toronto franchise in the National Hockey League (NHL). The Leafs placed second, and lost in the semi-finals to the Detroit Red Wings.

Offseason

Regular season

Final standings

Record vs. opponents

Schedule and results

Playoffs

Player statistics

Regular season
Scoring

Goaltending

Playoffs
Scoring

Goaltending

Awards and records

Transactions

Farm teams

Rochester Americans AHL
Toronto Marlboros OHA  Jr. A
St. Mikes Majors Metro Jr. A

References

Toronto Maple Leafs seasons
Toronto Maple Leafs season, 1960-61
Tor